The 2014 3. deild karla (English: Men's Third Division) was the 33rd season of fourth-tier football in Iceland. Ten teams contested the league, which as of 2013 is no longer the lowest division in Iceland following the restructuring of the league pyramid. The fixtures for the 2014 campaign were released by the KSÍ on their website; play began on 17 May and concluded on 13 September.

Teams
The league was contested by ten clubs, six of which played in the division during the 2013 season. 
Höttur and Hamar were relegated from the 2013 2. deild karla, replacing Fjarðabyggð and Huginn who were promoted to the 2014 2. deild karla
Grundarfjörður, ÍH, KFR, Leiknir F., Magni and Víðir competed in the division the previous season. 
Einherji and Berserkir were promoted from the 4. deild karla in the 2013 season, replacing Augnablik and Kári who were relegated to the 2014 season of the 4. deild.

Club information

Statistics

League table

Results
Each team plays every opponent once home and away for a total of 18 matches per club, and 90 matches altogether.

Top goalscorers

References

3. deild karla seasons
Iceland
Iceland
4